The 1986 FIBA World Championship squads were the squads of the 1986 FIBA World Championship, which was held in Spain, between 5 and 20 July 1986. Each one of the 24 teams at the tournament selected a squad of 12 players, for a total of 288 players.

Group A

 Nilo Guimarães
 Maury Ponickwar
 Gerson Victalino
 João José Vianna
 Rolando Ferreira
 Paulinho Villas Boas
 Jorge Guerra
 Marcel Ponickwar
 Marcelo Vido
 Silvio Malvesi
 Oscar Schmidt
 Israel Andrade

 Richard Dacoury
 Stéphane Ostrowski
 Hervé Dubuisson
 Frederic Hufnagel
 Valéry Demory
 Jacques Monclar
 Jean-Luc Deganis
 Eric Beugnot
 Georges Vestris
 Patrick Cham
 Christian Garnier
 Daniel Haquet
 (Coach: Jean Galle)

 Nikos Galis
 Panagiotis Giannakis
 Fanis Christodoulou
 Michalis Romanidis
 Nikos Filippou
 Liveris Andritsos
 Nikos Stavropoulos
 Argiris Kambouris
 Argyris Pedoulakis
 Panagiotis Karatzas
 Dimitris Dimakopoulos
 Christos Christodoulou
 (Coach: Kostas Politis)

 Hur Jae
 Park In-kyu
 Lee Min-hyun
 Cho Yoon-ho
 Han Ki-bum
 Lee Mun-kyu
 Kim Hyun-jun
 Kim You-taek
 Kim Sung-wook
 Lee Won-woo
 Lee Chung-hee
 Goh Myong-hwa
 (Coach: Kim In-kun)

 Ernesto Malcolm
 Mario Butler
 Rolando Frazer
 Reggie Grenald
 Rodolfo Gill
 Fernando Pinillo
 Braulio Rivas
 Adolfo Medrick
 Cirilo Escalona
 Mario Gálvez
 Enrique Grenald
 Daniel Macias
 (Coach: Frank Holness)

Group B

 Jean-Jacques
 David Dias
 Manuel Sousa
 Aníbal Moreira
 Adriano Baião
 Josué Campos
 José Carlos Guimaraes
 Zezé Assis
 Ademar Barros
 Paulo Macedo
 Coach: Victorino Cunha

 Daniel Scott
 Félix Morales
 Raúl Dubois
 Pedro Abreu
 Luis Calderón
 Noangel Luaces
 Eduardo Cabrera
 Luciano Rivero
 Roberto Simón Salomón
 Leonardo Pérez
 José Carlos Caballero
 Pedro Cobarrubia
 (Coach: Juan Carmelo Ortega Díaz)

 Doron Jamchi
 Mickey Berkowitz
 Adi Gordon
 Tomer Steinhauer
 Howard Lassoff
 Hen Lippin
 Motti Daniel
 Nir Rechlis
 Ari Rosenberg
 Doron Shefa
 Larry Bird-Curtis
 Ofer Yaakobi
 (Coach: Zvi Sherf)

 Arvydas Sabonis
 Valdis Valters
 Alexander Volkov
 Vladimir Tkachenko
 Tiit Sokk
 Alexander Belostenny
 Rimas Kurtinaitis
 Valdemaras Chomičius
 Sergei Tarakanov
 Valeri Tikhonenko
 Sergei Grishaev
 Andris Jekabsons
 (Coach: Vladimir Obukhov)

 Horacio López
 Ramiro Cortés
 Álvaro Tito
 Joe McCall
 Juan Mignone
 Horacio Perdomo
 Gabriel Waiter
 Luis Larrosa
 Luis Pierri
 Carlos Peinado
 Hebert Núñez
 Gustavo Sczygielski
 (Coach: Ramón Etchamendi)

Group C

 Antonello Riva
 Walter Magnifico
 Roberto Brunamonti
 Pierlo Marzorati
 Roberto Premier
 Ario Costa
 Renato Villalta
 Augusto Binelli
 Romeo Sacchetti
 Sandro dell'Agnello
 Enrico Gilardi
 Fulvio Polesello
 (Coach: Valerio Bianchini)

 Federico Lopez
 Ramón Rivas
 Jerome Mincy
 Angelo Cruz
 Felix Rivera
 Edgar de Leon
 Wesley Correa
 Jose Sosa
 Orlando Febres
 Frankie Torruellas
 Mario Morales
 Francisco de Leon (Coach: Angel Cancel)

 4. Muggsy Bogues
 5. Tommy Amaker
 6. Steve Kerr
 7. Kenny Smith
 8. Sean Elliott
 9. Derrick McKey
 10. Rony Seikaly
 11. David Robinson
 12. Tom Hammonds
 13. Brian Shaw
 14. Armen Gilliam
 15. Charles Smith
 (Coach: Lute Olson)

Gunther Behnke
 Chris Welp
 Michael Koch
 Hansi Gnad
 Ralf Risse
 Armin Andres
 Jan Villwock
 Rainer Greunke
 Holger Arpe
 Armin Sowa
 Lutz Wadehn
 Burkhard Schröder
 (Coach: Ralph Klein)

Group D

 4. Esteban Camisassa
 5. Héctor Campana
 6. Diego Maggi
 7. Hernán Montenegro
 8. Carlos Romano 
 9. Marcelo Milanesio
 10. Sergio Aispurúa
 11. Miguel Cortijo
 12. Sebastián Uranga 
 13. Gabriel Milovich 
 14. Luis Oroño 
 15. Fernando Borcel
 (Coach: Flor Meléndez)

 Gerry Besselink
 John Hatch
 Gordon Herbert
 Gerald Kazanowski
 Howard Kelsey
 Barry Mungar
 Dan Meagher
 Eli Pasquale
 Tony Simms
 Jay Triano
 David Turcotte
 Greg Wiltjer
 (Coach: Jack Donahue)

 Rik Smits
 Jelle Esveldt
 Ronald Schilp
 Cock van de Lagemaat
 Raymond Bottse
 Rene Ebeltjes
 Chris van Dinten
 Hans Heijdeman
 Erik Griekspoor
 Emill Hagens
 Marco de Waard
 Peter van Noord
 (Coach: Ruud Harrewijn)

 Gilbert Gordon
 Peter Pokai
 Stan Hill
 Neil Stephens
 Dave Edmonds
 Ian Webb
 Dave Mason
 Tony Smith
 Colin Crampton
 Frank Mulvihill
 Glen Denham
 John Rademakers
 (Coach: Robert Bishop)

References

1986 FIBA World Championship at basket-stats.info

External links
 
 

FIBA Basketball World Cup squads
1986 FIBA World Championship